Clare-Louise Brumley (born 30 October 1977) is an Australian cross-country skier, who represented Australia at the 2006 Winter Olympics.

She was selected for the pursuit and 30 km freestyle, but could only compete in the former due to her illness. She placed 42nd out of 67 entrants.

References 

Australian female cross-country skiers
Olympic cross-country skiers of Australia
Cross-country skiers at the 2006 Winter Olympics
Living people
1977 births